Schachen (Herisau) railway station is a railway station in Herisau, in the Swiss canton of Appenzell Ausserrhoden. It is an intermediate station on the Bodensee–Toggenburg railway and is served by local trains only.

Services 
Schachen (Herisau) is served by two services of the St. Gallen S-Bahn:

 : hourly service over the Bodensee–Toggenburg railway between Nesslau-Neu St. Johann and Altstätten SG.
 : hourly service over the Bodensee–Toggenburg railway via Sargans (circular operation).

References

External links 
 
 Schachen (Herisau) station on SBB

Railway stations in the canton of Appenzell Ausserrhoden
Südostbahn stations
Herisau